Petrus Kafiar (died 1926) was an evangelist active on Irian Jaya.

Background
The son of a headman, Kafiar was a native of Supiori Island; his date of birth has been given variously as 1864 and c. 1873. When he was seven years old he was kidnapped during a raid, and was sold for fifty florins to a Moluccan carpenter, a Christian, and his wife; an Indonesian missionary couple at Mansinam paid to ensure his liberation. He received his baptism in 1887.

In 1892 he and another Papuan, Timotheus Awendu, were sent under the auspices of the Mansinam mission to attend the Depok Seminary to study for missionary work. Kafiar became a teacher-preacher, serving in various locations before returning in 1908 to the village of his birth. He went on to become a pioneer of missionary work in Biak. He was fluent in both Dutch and Malay, which added to his appeal among the Biaks, who came to be seen as the most successful of those groups Christianized under the Dutch.

See also
List of kidnappings
List of solved missing person cases

References

1926 deaths
Year of birth uncertain
People from Biak Numfor Regency
Papuan people
Christian missionaries in Indonesia
Converts to Christianity
Indonesian Christian missionaries
Missionary educators
Kidnapped Indonesian people
Missing person cases in Indonesia
Formerly missing people